Mildred Alice Dover (born 12 April 1941) is a former educator and Canadian politician, who was a member of the Legislative Assembly of Prince Edward Island from 1996 to 2007.

A native of Fanningbrook, Prince Edward Island, she represented the electoral district of Tracadie-Fort Augustus and was a member of the Progressive Conservative Party. She served in the provincial cabinet as Minister of Health and Social Services, Attorney General and Minister of Education. Dover served as Speaker of the Legislative Assembly of Prince Edward Island from 2000 to 2003.

Dover was educated at Prince of Wales College and the University of Prince Edward Island. She taught school for 35 years and then began a career as a real estate agent in 1993. Dover was an unsuccessful candidate for a seat in the provincial assembly in 1993.

References 
 

Living people
People from Queens County, Prince Edward Island
Progressive Conservative Party of Prince Edward Island MLAs
Women MLAs in Prince Edward Island
1941 births
Speakers of the Legislative Assembly of Prince Edward Island
Members of the Executive Council of Prince Edward Island
Prince of Wales College alumni
University of Prince Edward Island alumni
21st-century Canadian politicians
21st-century Canadian women politicians
Women government ministers of Canada
Women legislative speakers